Randy James Scarbery  (born June 22, 1952) is a former professional baseball pitcher. He played in part of two seasons in the major leagues from – for the Chicago White Sox.

External links

1952 births
Living people
Chicago White Sox players
Major League Baseball pitchers
Baseball players from California
Sportspeople from Fresno, California
USC Trojans baseball players
Birmingham A's players
Tucson Toros players
Chattanooga Lookouts players
New Orleans Pelicans (baseball) players
San Jose Missions players
Iowa Oaks players
Salt Lake City Gulls players